Talavera is a municipality of the comarca of the Segarra in the province of Lleida, Catalonia, Spain.

References

External links 
 Official website
 Government data pages 

Municipalities in Segarra
Populated places in Segarra